Tell Mureibit is a Heavy Neolithic archaeological site approximately  north of Tyre, Lebanon. It is located in a wadi near Qasimiye, Qasimiyeh or Kasimiyeh  on the north bank of the Litani river. Material was collected by E. Passemard which is kept in the National Museum of Beirut. It consists of heavy, rough and usually bifacial tools of indeterminate date that has been likened to other Heavy Neolithic material of the Qaraoun culture.

References

Heavy Neolithic sites
Neolithic settlements
Archaeological sites in Lebanon